The 1992 North Star Conference women's basketball tournament was held at the ? in DeKalb, Illinois. The tournament began on March 5, 1992, and ended on March 7, 1992.

North Star Conference standings

1992 North Star Conference Tournament
First round Bye Green Bay
First round March 5, 1992 Cleveland State 83, Wright State 68
First round March 5 or 6, 1992 Northern Illinois 87, Illinois Chicago 45
First round March 5 or 6, 1992 Valparaiso 82, Akron 65
Semifinals March 5 or 6, 1992 Green Bay 78, Cleveland State 56
Semifinals March 6, 1992 Northern Illinois 87, Valparaiso 72
Championship March 7, 1992 Northern Illinois 84, Green Bay 66

References

North Star
North Star Conference